Ayache Belaoued (born January 5, 1984) is an Algerian footballer. He currently plays as a midfielder for MO Constantine in the Algerian Ligue Professionnelle 2.

Biography
In December, 2007, Belaoued had a successful trial with the Portuguese side S.L. Benfica. However, still under contract with USM Blida, he was unable to join the team. He joined JS Kabylie in the summer of 2008 but left the club after just one season to sign with MC Saïda in the second division.

International career
On April 5, 2008, Belaoued was called up by the Algerian A' National Team for a game against USM Blida on April 11.

References

1984 births
Living people
People from Ouled El Alleug
Algerian footballers
JS Kabylie players
USM Blida players
MC Saïda players
CA Bordj Bou Arréridj players
Algerian Ligue Professionnelle 1 players
MO Constantine players
Algerian Ligue 2 players
Association football midfielders
WA Boufarik players
21st-century Algerian people